Ōnohana Taketora (born 23 June 1958 as Hisayoshi Ono) is a former sumo wrestler from Yatsushiro, Kumamoto, Japan. He made his professional debut in March 1974 and reached the top division in March 1988. His highest rank was maegashira 13. Upon retirement from active competition he became an elder in the Japan Sumo Association, under the name Onoe. He left the Sumo Association in April 2004.

Career record

See also
Glossary of sumo terms
List of past sumo wrestlers
List of sumo tournament second division champions

References

1958 births
Living people
People from Yatsushiro, Kumamoto
Japanese sumo wrestlers
Sumo people from Kumamoto Prefecture